The 2023 Forbidden Door is the upcoming second annual Forbidden Door professional wrestling pay-per-view (PPV) event and supershow co-produced by the American promotion All Elite Wrestling (AEW) and the Japan-based New Japan Pro-Wrestling (NJPW). It will take place on June 25, 2023, at the Scotiabank Arena in Toronto, Ontario, Canada.

Production

Background
In February 2021, the American professional wrestling promotion All Elite Wrestling (AEW) started a partnership with the Japanese promotion, New Japan Pro-Wrestling (NJPW). After a year of AEW and NJPW wrestlers appearing on each other's shows, the two companies co-promoted a pay-per-view (PPV) event titled Forbidden Door in June 2022. The event took its name from the same term often used by AEW when referring to working with other professional wrestling promotions.

On March 15, 2023, a second Forbidden Door event between AEW and NJPW was scheduled to be held on June 25, 2023, at the Scotiabank Arena in Toronto, Ontario, Canada, thus establishing Forbidden Door as an annual event between the two companies. Tickets will go on sale on March 24. The event will also kick off a month-long tour of Canada for AEW, which will include their weekly television programs and house shows.

Storylines
Forbidden Door will feature professional wrestling matches that involve different wrestlers from pre-existing scripted feuds and storylines. Wrestlers portray heroes, villains, or less distinguishable characters in scripted events that build tension and culminate in a wrestling match or series of matches.

See also
2023 in professional wrestling
List of All Elite Wrestling pay-per-view events
List of major NJPW events

References

External links

2023 All Elite Wrestling pay-per-view events
Events in Toronto
New Japan Pro-Wrestling shows
Professional wrestling in Toronto
Professional wrestling joint events